The 2001 NCAA Women's Water Polo Championship was the first annual tournament to determine the national championship of NCAA women's collegiate water polo. The single elimination tournament was played at the Avery Aquatic Center in Stanford, California during May 2001.

UCLA defeated Stanford in the final, 5–4, to win their first NCAA championship. The Bruins (19–4) were coached by Adam Krikorian. Krikorian also won a championship as the coach of UCLA's men's water polo team during the same 2000–01 season.

The leading scorer for the tournament was Kelly Heuchan, from UCLA, with 4 goals. First and second All Tournament Teams were also named, with seven players comprising the former (including the tournament's Most Outstanding Player, Coralie Simmons from UCLA) and six for the latter.

Qualification
Since there has only ever been one single national championship for women's water polo, all NCAA women's water polo programs (whether from Division I, Division II, or Division III) were eligible. A total of 4 teams were invited to contest this championship.

Tournament bracket
Site: Avery Aquatic Center, Stanford, California

All tournament teams

First Team
Coralie Simmons, UCLA (Most Outstanding Player)
Robin Beauregard, UCLA
Kelly Heuchan, UCLA
Jackie Frank, Stanford
Ellen Estes, Stanford
Brenda Villa, Stanford
Lucy Windes, Loyola Marymount

Second Team
Margie Dingeldein, Stanford
Jamie Hipp, UCLA
Elaine Zivich, UCLA
Jamie Kroeze, Loyola Marymount
Jenny Lamb, UCLA
Kristin Guerin, UCLA

See also 
Pre-NCAA Intercollegiate Women's Water Polo Champions (tournaments from before NCAA sponsorship in 2001)
 NCAA Men's Water Polo Championship

References

NCAA Women's Water Polo Championship
NCAA Women's Water Polo Championship
2001 in sports in California
May 2001 sports events in the United States
2001